Beal railway station, also known as Beal for Holy Island railway station, was a railway station that served the village of Beal, Northumberland, England from 1847 to 1968 on the East Coast Main Line.

History 
The station opened on 29 March 1847 by the York, Newcastle and Berwick Railway. It was situated just under a mile along the Holy Island Road which runs from the A1 to Holy Island. There was no footbridge or subway so the passengers had to switch between platforms via a level crossing. A large stone-built goods warehouse was provided to the northwest of the station which was entered via one of the two sidings. In 1941, Beal was one of the few stations to remain open during the period of the Second World War, the others being Alnmouth, Chathill, Tweedmouth and Belford. The goods warehouse was demolished sometime after British Rail formed. The station closed on 29 January 1968.

As part of this campaign they have proposed that the former station at Beal should be reopened so as to improve public transport access to Lindisfarne and St Cuthbert's Way.

References 

Disused railway stations in Northumberland
1847 establishments in Scotland
1968 disestablishments in Scotland
Former North Eastern Railway (UK) stations
Railway stations in Great Britain opened in 1847
Railway stations in Great Britain closed in 1968